Lucien Nicolas (28 April 1909 – 29 August 1966) was a French politician.

Nicolas was born in Rambervillers.  He represented the Popular Republican Movement (MRP) in the National Assembly from 1956 to 1958.

References
Base de Données des Députés Français Depuis 1789, Assemblée Nationale (French)

1909 births
1966 deaths
People from Vosges (department)
Politicians from Grand Est
Popular Republican Movement politicians
Deputies of the 3rd National Assembly of the French Fourth Republic